Top speed may refer to:

Speed
 Speed record
 Production car speed record
 Aircraft design speeds, see V speeds
 Terminal velocity

As a name
 Top Speed (film), a 1930 musical comedy film
 Top Speed Baseball, a team competing in the Pacific West Baseball League
 Full Throttle (1987 video game), also known as Top Speed, a one-player racing arcade game